Dr. Ahmed Taleb Ibrahimi (born 5 January 1932) is an Algerian politician and intellectual.

He is the son of Islamic theologian and renowned scholar Bachir Ibrahimi, and served in multiple ministerial roles in Algeria from the 1960s until the late 1980s. A staunch anti-colonialist and proponent of Arab heritage through his writings and his actions, Dr. Ibrahimi was jailed by the French authorities as a militant of the FLN Party.  He ran for president in 1999 but withdrew from the race along with all other opposition candidates hours before voting commenced, claiming electoral fraud by the army. In 2004, his proposed candidacy was disqualified because of alleged links with the proscribed Islamic Salvation Front (FIS). His platform includes moderate Islamism and adherence to free-market economics.
Dr. Ibrahimi is the father of two sons, and currently resides in the city of Algiers, Algeria with his wife Souad.

Early years
Ahmed Taleb-Ibrahimi was born on January 5, 1932, in the eastern city of Setif, 220 miles off the Algerian capital. He grew up in a family of modest means, which was yet in contrast intellectually and spiritually wealthy. His father, Sheikh Bachir Ibrahimi, a renowned scholar, was already fighting the French colonialism not with a military weapon but with his sharp pen and voice. He was Deputy President and later President of the “Association of the Oulemaa”, whose main objective was to build schools in order to inform & educate the populace, raise awareness about the Arabic heritage & a moderate Islam, and free Algeria from the shackles of colonialism. Because of his militant activities, the French occupiers extradited him numerous times, and assigned him under house arrest for “spreading subversion.” This in turn obliged the family to be scattered around the country.

As a child and an adolescent, Ahmed quickly acquired from his father a precious knowledge and a general culture which he will later rely and build on. In the late 1940s, he passed his Baccalaureate exam and went on studying medicine. In 1954 he moved to Paris to further his medical education, and after that he earned a degree in Hematology, interning at few Parisian hospitals.

French prison until Algerian independence
Whilst Ahmed completed his medical specialty, he was simultaneously a militant and an advocate for Algerian independence. With some other militants, he launched in 1952 "Le Jeune Musulman", a newspaper addressing the needs of the young generation in retrieving its identity after years of colonization. He was elected as the 1st president of l'UGEMA (Union Générale des étudiants Musulmans Algériens). Later he was appointed member of "Fédération de France", the FLN representation in France. No wonder that in February 1957 he was arrested and imprisoned in Paris. During almost 5 years in French prisons, he developed friendship in so far as brotherhood with other inmates who will later become the elite of a free Algeria. In September 1961 he was liberated and spent few months overseas, among other places, in Switzerland, Tunisia, and Morocco to physically heal from illness caused by years of incarceration.

Algerian doctor 
In 1962 he pursued his career as a doctor in the main hospital of Algiers. After the independence, in July 1962, Ahmed continued his work of reforming, renovating the hospital, teaching the next generation of Algerian doctors, and learning from foreign professors who chose to remain in independent Algeria. Moreover, during the next 3 years, he received many enticing offers to be Ambassador, and had other senior government positions offered to him which he refused because he wanted to stay with his family which he missed from all those years of war and separation. Even the-then first President of Algeria, Ahmed Ben Bella, made several overtures to Ahmed so he works with him. Ahmed politely declined the offer and made it clear that he wished to continue practicing medicine rather than engage in Politics. In addition, Ahmed had the financial responsibility to find housing for his parents and ailing sister, and share his meager salary with them.

Though inconceivable and oddly paradoxical for someone of the stature of Sheikh Bachir Ibrahimi – a prominent scholar who spent all his life fighting and suffering along with his family to render Algeria a free and prosperous nation – the family was hard-pressed to find a place to live in an independent Algeria. This was indeed not a coincidence at all in as much as the-then President Benbella was hostile to Sheikh Bachir and his son Ahmed because the latter did not agree with his policies in general, and the extreme socialism that the President adopted in particular.

Torture under Benbella
Following the orders of President Benbella, Ahmed was arrested and jailed in Algerian prisons in July 1964. These horrible 8 months were considerably worse than the 5 years spent in French prisons. Indeed, during this time he was repeatedly tortured in an egregious way by some of his countrymen. It is worthwhile to remind the reader that during the Algerian revolution (1954–1962), the International Community strongly condemned France for torturing Algerians. Alas, even after Algeria became independent, some Algerians themselves, with President Benbella at the helm perpetuated this barbaric practice against his jail companions. In fact, it is alarmingly sickening that although Benbella and Ahmed were amongst many inmates within the same French prison in the late 1950s, becoming by default “brothers in arms”, Benbella later became President, executed some of his companions, and wished to do the same with Ahmed. The latter was lucky enough that the-then Defense Minister Houari Boumediene intervened to spare him. What was then the “crime” of Ahmed Taleb-Ibrahimi? He simply did not agree with the policies and direction of Benbella, and refused to work with him.

In February 1965, Ahmed was released weakened by the excruciating episode he endured. He traveled to Switzerland to heal emotionally and physically with some of the other inmates who were lucky to make it alive under Benbella’s heinous torture. Upon his return, he resumed work in the hospital and strenuously endeavored to enjoy and make up the missed moments with his family. Unfortunately, 3 months later Cheikh Bachir died on 20 May 1965. And a month later, on June 19, 1965 Benbella was overthrown via a bloodless coup by Defense Minister Houari Boumediene who will become President of Algeria.

Minister under Boumediene
In 1965 President Boumediene offered Ahmed the position of Minister of Education. The latter went on a campaign of reforming the Algerian school and its educational system. In 1970, Boumediene reshuffled his cabinet, and appointed Ahmed Minister of Information and Culture until April 1977. By this date, the President chose to have Ahmed even closer to him, and created the position of “Minister Advisor to the President.” Throughout the years, it was clear that Ahmed earned the trust and confidence of the President.

Later years and the election of 1999

However, such allegations have been contradicted by the trust placed by the Algerian people in Abdelaziz Bouteflika three times again through the elections of 2004, 2009 and 2014. Although Most Serious Opposition Parties confirm that Bouteflika was repeatedly elected with massive fraud and the Algerian People finally overthrown him in 2019 , When he tried to run for a fifth term.

References

Taleb-Ibrahimi, Ahmed.  Letters From Prison.  English Translation (c) 1988, 1st edition (c)1966, Allied Publishers Private Limited, Ahmedabad
Taleb-Ibrahimi, Ahmed.  Memoires d’un Algerien Tome 1, Reves et Epreuves (1932–1965).” 2006
Taleb-Ibrahimi, Ahmed.  Memoires d’un Algerien Tome 2, La passion de Batir (1965-1978).” 2008.

1932 births
Algerian hematologists
Culture ministers of Algeria
Living people
National Liberation Front (Algeria) politicians
People from Sétif
Foreign ministers of Algeria
Education ministers of Algeria
21st-century Algerian people